Andi Sultan Daeng Radja (1894–1963) was an Indonesian politician, who is now regarded as a National Hero of Indonesia.

References

1894 births
1963 deaths
National Heroes of Indonesia
Place of birth missing